Manuela Cañizares (1769-1814) was an Ecuadorian salonist and heroine of independence.

Life 

Cañizares was the host of a popular literary salon in Quito from about 1797, which was a center of the city's intellectual life. On 9–10 August 1809, Manuela Cañizares hosted the famous meeting between the Ecuadorian rebels, which resulted in the formation of the first rebel government, Junta Autonoma de Quito, and declaration of independence in her salon. She was not only the host of the meeting, but an active participant in it, and reputedly a leading and driving force behind the revolution.

Death 

She was sentenced to death in absentia by the Spanish authorities and went into hiding during the war.

Legacy
In 1901, President Eloy Alfaro named the first school for women in Ecuador "Manuela Cañizares" after her.

References
  Salazar Garcés, Sonia; Sevilla Naranjo, Alexandra (2009). Mujeres de la Revolución de Quito (Primera edición). Quito: FONSAL. pp. 81–88. .

1769 births
1814 deaths
19th-century Ecuadorian people
18th-century Ecuadorian people
Ecuadorian salon-holders